Mosley Music Group (MMG) is a record label founded and formed by producer Tim "Timbaland" Mosley. Founded in 2006, the imprint is distributed exclusively by Interscope Records and Def Jam Recordings.

History
The label was created after Timbaland's former label, Beat Club, folded. The first album release from MMG, Nelly Furtado's Loose, went on to be certified platinum. The label's second release was Timbaland's own second album Shock Value.  MMG's third release was OneRepublic's debut album Dreaming Out Loud on November 20, 2007, from which the single "Apologize" hit #2 on the Billboard Hot 100. The week ending November 10, 2007, "Apologize" was the biggest radio airplay hit in the history of Top 40 radio in North America, racking up an astounding 10,331 spins beating the previous record held by Nelly Furtado's hit "Promiscuous". In February 2008 SoundScan data reported that "Apologize" was one of only two songs in history to sell 3 million digital downloads.

After nearly ten years with Interscope Records, Timbaland moved distribution to Epic Records in November 2014. The move to the new label was due to his involvement in the success of Michael Jackson's second posthumous album Xscape. Most of the artists signed to Mosley Music Group will have their future recordings handled by Epic with the exception of OneRepublic, who will remain at Interscope.

Artists 
 Timbaland
 OneRepublic
 Carson Lueders

Former artists 
 Magoo
 Izza Kizza
 Keri Hilson
 Hayes
 Billy Blue
 Soul Diggaz
 Chris Cornell
 Lyrica Anderson
 D.O.E.
 SoShy
 Nelly Furtado
 Bubba Sparxxx
 V. Bozeman 
 Tink
 Cosha TG 
 Yung Tory

Discography

See also
 List of record labels

References

American record labels
Record labels established in 2006
Vanity record labels
Labels distributed by Universal Music Group
Hip hop record labels
Contemporary R&B record labels
Timbaland